Club Deportivo Brollón is a Spanish football team based in A Pobra do Brollón, in the autonomous community of Galicia. Founded in 1991, it plays in Segunda Autonómica – Group 8, holding home matches at Campo Municipal Os Medos.

Season to season

2 seasons in Preferente Autonómica

External links
Segunda Autonómica
Segunda Autonómica
senafutbolmarin.blogspot.com.es profile

Football clubs in Galicia (Spain)
Divisiones Regionales de Fútbol clubs
Association football clubs established in 1991
1991 establishments in Spain